Mohammad Jan Fana Safi (born 25 June 1932) is a poet, writer, and artist. He was commonly known as Mohammad Jan Fana. Born in northern Afghanistan, he lived in Afghanistan's capital, Kabul, for most of his life.

Personal life

He was married and had six children, three boys and three girls, who all lived in Kabul, Afghanistan but moved to the United States after Major Fana's death.

He played a number of musical instruments such as the mandolin, harmonium and accordion.

Writings and Artwork

Poetry and Writing
Mohammad Jan Fana Safi has 13 published books and has written countless poems. He wrote poetry in three languages: Pashto, Dari, and English.

Artwork
Mohammad Jan Fana Safi has had many of his illustrations published in newspapers and magazines.

References

1932 births
20th-century Afghan poets
Living people
21st-century Afghan poets